The Singles Collection is the second greatest hits album by American singer Britney Spears. It was released on November 10, 2009, through Jive Records to commemorate her ten-year anniversary since entering the music industry. The compilation was released in many different formats, including a one-disc edition, a CD+DVD edition and a box set, which contained twenty-nine singles, each packaged in its own slip case with original cover art. The CD+DVD edition, as well as the box set, contains a DVD with Spears's music videos. The album includes a new song, "3", produced by Max Martin and Shellback.

The Singles Collection received widespread acclaim from the music critics, who noted Spears's impact and influence on pop music during her first decade in the music industry. The album entered the top ten in France and Japan, and peaked at number twenty-two on the US Billboard 200. "3" was released as the lead and only single from the album. In the United States, it debuted atop the Billboard Hot 100.

Release
On July 12, 2009, Spears confirmed through her Twitter account that she had begun recording new material, stating she was going into the studio with Swedish songwriter and producer Max Martin. On September 23, 2009, Jive Records officially announced the release of a greatest hits titled The Singles Collection through Spears's official website, in celebration of Spears's ten-year anniversary in the music industry. The album followed her previous greatest hits album Greatest Hits: My Prerogative (2004). The release date was confirmed to be November 24, 2009 and the album included a new song titled "3", produced by Martin. The compilation was available in two main editions, a standard edition as well as a box set. The standard version contained a single CD with seventeen tracks, including "3". The boxset contained her twenty-nine singles including "3", with each single packaged in its own slip case with original cover art, accompanied by an original b-side or remix. It also included a booklet featuring iconic images and facts about each track as well as a DVD featuring all of Spears's music videos to date in chronological order.

On October 14, 2009, Jive Records announced in a new press release that the date for the standard edition was moved up to November 10, 2009. The date for the release of the box set remained the same. The following day, a CD+DVD edition was announced to be released on November 10, 2009, outside North America. This edition included the standard edition track listing as well as the single "I'm Not a Girl, Not Yet a Woman".

Singles
"3" was confirmed as the only single from the album, released on October 6, 2009, along with the announcement of The Singles Collection. It was released to radio stations on September 29, 2009. The song received positive reviews from critics, and debuted at number one on the US Billboard Hot 100, breaking many chart records. It made Spears the first artist in over three years to debut at the top position and the only non-American Idol artist in eleven years to do so. It was the sixteenth song in the chart history to debut at the top position and also the shortest title for a song reaching the top of the chart. "3" also debuted at number one in Canada and reached the top ten in Australia, Belgium (Wallonia), Czech Republic, Finland, France, Ireland, Norway, Sweden and the United Kingdom.

Critical reception

The compilation album received universal critical acclaim. Stephen Thomas Erlewine of AllMusic gave the collection five stars and compared it to Greatest Hits: My Prerogative, saying that although they had the same length, they were "different listening experiences". He also noted that the more recent tracks "help push The Singles away from teen pop and toward pure dance-pop bliss. [...] It does result in a stronger overall listen, since there are no slow patches here, just a parade of relentless hooks and rhythms that wound up defining the sound of a decade". Mayer Nissim of Digital Spy also gave the album five stars stating that "[it] perfectly captures the career of one of the best singles artists of the last ten years. Running from '...Baby One More Time' to 'Radar', you get a single-disc timeline that shows a progression in style and substance from school uniform-wearing pop ingénue to sultry motorik saucepot. [...] The only arguable weak link is the Madonna-featuring 'Me Against the Music', but in this context what once looked like a respectful passing of the baton now seems like an unconditional surrender of pop Queendom to its rightful heir." The reviewer also noted the impact on popular culture and pop music of Spears, highlighting "Oops!... I Did It Again", "Toxic" and "Stronger".

Brian Linder of IGN commented "2004's Greatest Hits: My Prerogative [...] captured the highlights from Britney's heyday, but lacks the more mature club-oriented material that she's churned out in recent years. That helps make this collection a justifiable fan purchase". Mike Diver of BBC Online called it "the definitive Britney album" and added that "these songs don't just make a mark, lingering in the memory – they are essential pieces of the past ten years of pop history, and deserve better than dismissal by so-called discerning listeners". Evan Sawdey of PopMatters called the album "a high-gloss collection of tunes that selectively sums up the career of one of the biggest female pop singers of the past decade. It's a disc that's light on filler [...] and heavy on Spears' more high-energy cuts, which, without question, play to her strengths as a performer".

Commercial performance
In the United States, The Singles Collection debuted at number 22 on the Billboard 200, selling 26,800 copies in its first week. The album has sold over 250,000 copies in the United States. In Canada, the album was certified gold by the Canadian Recording Industry Association (CRIA) for sales over 40,000 copies. The album debuted at number 15 in Mexico and was certified gold by the Asociación Mexicana de Productores de Fonogramas y Videogramas (AMPROFON) for shipments over 30,000 units. On November 23, 2009, the album debuted on the Australian Albums Chart at number twenty-three. The same week, it debuted at number 22 in New Zealand. The album reached the top forty in Belgium (Wallonia), Denmark, Greece, New Zealand and Norway, and also charted in Belgium (Flanders), Finland, Spain and the Netherlands. In January 2011, The Singles Collection re-entered the charts in Ireland and the United Kingdom, at numbers 51 and 47, respectively. In 2021, the album saw a resurgence in popularity on the UK Albums Chart, charting for 39 consecutive weeks throughout the year.

Track listing

Greatest hits album

Box set

Notes
 signifies a co-producer
 signifies a vocal producer
 signifies a remixer

Charts

Weekly charts

Year-end charts

Certifications and sales

Release history

Notes

References

External links
Official website

2009 greatest hits albums
Britney Spears compilation albums
Albums produced by Bloodshy & Avant
Albums produced by Danja (record producer)
Albums produced by Guy Sigsworth
Albums produced by Rami Yacoub
Albums produced by Max Martin
Albums produced by the Neptunes
Jive Records compilation albums